XDXF (XML Dictionary eXchange Format) is a project to unite all existing open dictionaries and provide both users and developers with a universal XML-based format, convertible from and to other popular formats like Mova, PtkDic, and StarDict.

Available dictionaries
As of December 15, 2006 the XDXF project repository contains 615 dictionaries, which are collectively 936,189,613 bytes in size (compressed) and contain 24,804,355 articles.

Software

GUIs 
The XDXF file format is used by Alpus, SimpleDict and GoldenDict. Also StarDict starting with version 2.4.6 has basic support for XDXF.

Converters
There are numerous converters: pyglossary, xdxf2slob and others. Initially, the project had its own converter, but it was deprecated.

Alternatives 
Many languages serve a similar purpose, e.g., the Lexical Markup Framework (XML and other serializations), OntoLex (RDF), DICT (text format), or the dicML markup languages. As for dicML and XDXF, neither concept is specified completely. For example, XDXF lacks elements to annotate possible hyphenations, while the recent working draft of dicML does not include elements to describe the etymology of words.

References

External links
Project site
XDXF dictionaries repository
XDXF Standard
Easy XDXF Dictionary – Free dictionary for Iphone

Computer file formats
Dictionary formats
Markup languages
Open formats
XML-based standards